The Jim Butler Mining Company Stone Row Houses are a pair of stone duplex houses located at 314 Everett Ave. in Tonopah, Nevada, United States. The Jim Butler Mining Company built the houses on its mining grounds in 1904 to house its workers. The houses feature stone walls and pyramid-shaped roofs; each home has two rooms on each side. The homes are typical of workers' housing used in Tonopah's mining industry. Margaret Cluff bought the houses in 1905 to use as rental properties.

The houses were added to the National Register of Historic Places on May 20, 1982.

References

Houses completed in 1904
Houses on the National Register of Historic Places in Nevada
National Register of Historic Places in Tonopah, Nevada
Houses in Nye County, Nevada